In mathematics, the term "characteristic function" can refer to any of several distinct concepts:

 The indicator function of a subset, that is the function

which for a given subset A of X, has value 1 at points of A and 0 at points of X − A.
 There is an indicator function for affine varieties over a finite field: given a finite set of functions  let  be their vanishing locus.
 The characteristic function in convex analysis, closely related to the indicator function of a set:

 In probability theory, the characteristic function of any probability distribution on the real line is given by the following formula, where X is any random variable with the distribution in question:

where  denotes expected value. For multivariate distributions, the product tX is replaced by a scalar product of vectors.
 The characteristic function of a cooperative game in game theory.
 The characteristic polynomial in linear algebra.
 The characteristic state function in statistical mechanics.
 The Euler characteristic, a topological invariant.
 The receiver operating characteristic in statistical decision theory.
 The point characteristic function in statistics.

References